Oro (Oron) is a Lower Cross River language of Nigeria.
The phonemes of Oron comprise seven oral vowels í, ε, e, a, o, ɔ, u, five plosive consonants b, kp, d, t, k, three nasal consonants m, ŋ, n, three fricative consonants f, s, h, two semi-vowel consonants w, y and one lateral consonant l.  The lateral consonant is an unusual feature of Oro and it is not found in most neighbouring varieties.
  
The Oron language does not possess any affixes or verb forms to express passive actions; 'he is received' becomes 'they receive him'. Finally, it may be noted that the relative order of the simple Oron sentence is subject-verb-object.

References

Lower Cross River languages
Languages of Nigeria
Oron languages